A blind fish is a fish without functional eyes. Most blind fish species are found in dark habitats such as the deep ocean, deep river channels and underground.

Blind fish species

Agnathans 

Myxine glutinosa
Myxine circifrons
Polistotrema stouti

Cartilaginous fishes 
Torpediniformes
Benthobatis moresbyi
Typhlonarke aysoni
Typhlonarke tarakea

Bony fishes 

 
 

 

Anguilliformes
Moringuidae
Moringua abbreviata
Salmoniformes  
Ipnopidae
Ipnops murrayi
Ipnops agassizi
Ipnops meadi
Bathymicrops regis
Bathymicrops brevianalis
Bathyphlops sewelli
Characiformes
Characidae
Anoptichthys jordani   
Anoptichthys hubbsi
Anoptichthys antrobius
Stygichthys typhlops
Cypriniformes
Cyprinidae
Caecobarbus geertsii
Barbopsis devecchii
Iranocypris typhlops
Phreatichthys andruzzii
Typhlogarra widdowsoni
Puntius microps
Sinocyclocheilus anophthalmus
Cobitidae
 Cryptotora thamicola
 Nemacheilus troglocataractus 
 Nemacheilus starostini 
 Schistura spiesi
 Schistura oedipus
 Schistura deansmarti
 Schistura kaysonei 
 Oreonectes anophthalmus
 Heminoemacheilus hyalinus 
Percopsiformes
Amblyopsidae  
 Amblyopsis rosae 
 Amblyopsis spelaea
 Chologaster cornuta 
 Forbesichthys agassizii 
 Speoplatyrhinus poulsoni 
 Typhlichthys subterraneus
Siluriformes
Ictaluridae
Ameiurus nebulosus
Prietella phreatophila
Prietella lundbergi 
Satan eurystomus
Trichomycteridae
Cetopsis caecutiens
Phreatobius cisternarum
Pareiodon microps
Phreatobius sanguijuela
Phreatobius dracunculus
Pimelodidae
Caecorhamdia urichi
Caecorhamdella brasiliensis
Pimelodella kronei
Clariidae
Channallabes apus
Dolichallabes microphthalmus
Gymnallabes tihoni
Horaglanis Krishnai
Uegitglanis zammaranoi
Typhlichthys subterraneus
Lophiiformes
Diceratiidae  
Bufoceratias wedli
Neoceratiidae  
Neoceratias spinifer
Ceratiidae  
Cryptopsaras couesii
Ceratias holboelli
Ophidiiformes
Aphyonidae  
Aphyonus gelatinosus
Aphyonus mollis
Barathronus bicolor
Barathronus parfaiti
Barathronus affinis
Barathronus diaphanus	
Bythitidae 
Ogilbia galapagosensis
Dermatopsis macrodon
Dipulus caecus
Ophidiidae 	
Leucicorus lusciosus
Leucochlamys cryptophthalmus
Leucochlamys jonassoni
Lucifuca subterraneus
Monothrix polylepis
Sciadonus pedicellaris
Sciadonus kullenbergi 
Tauredophidium hextii
Sciadonus cryptophthalmus
Typhliasina pearsi 
Tauredophidium hextii
Typhlonus nasus
Synbranchiformes 
Synbranchidae
Ophisternon candidum
Macrotrema caligans
Ophisternon bengalense
Ophisternon infernale
Monopterus boueti
Mastacembelidae
Mastacembelus brichardi
Perciformes
Gobiidae 
Caragobius urolepis
Lethops connectens
Luciogobius albus
Milyeringa veritas
Typhleotris madagascariensis 
Caragobius urolepis
Gobioididae
Brachyamblyopus brachysoma
Brachyamblyopus multiradiatus
Brachyamblyopus coectus
Brachyamblyopus urolepis
Brachyamblyopus intermedius
Taenioides cirratus
Taenioides eruptionis
Taenioides anguillaris
Taenioidesrubicundus
Trypauchen vagina 
Trypauchen raha
Trypauchen taenia
Trypauchenichthys sumatrensis
Trypauchenichthys typus
Paratrypauchen microcephalus
Pleuronectiformes
Soleidae
Typhlachirus caecus
Cetomimiformes
Cetominidae
Ditropichthys storeri

See also
 Troglofauna

References

External links

Blind animals